Illinois Central Combination Depot-Ackley is a historic building located in Ackley, Iowa, United States. The Dubuque & Sioux City Railroad, an affiliate of the Illinois Central Railroad (IC), laid the first rail track to Iowa Falls in 1865. Two years later the Iowa Falls & Sioux City Railroad, another IC affiliate, continued construction of the line to the west, and it reached Sioux City by 1870. They built a plain, two-story frame depot to serve Ackley. From the 1890s to the 1920s the IC replaced its first generation stations with new brick structures. IC architect J.H. Schott designed the new depot at Ackley, and it was built by Coomer & Small Construction Company of Sioux City. The long and low single-story brick building exhibits influences from the Prairie School and the Tudor Revival style. A combination depot is one that incorporates passenger and freight services in the same building. It was also an island depot, meaning that it sat in the middle of the tracks. It was one of the last replacement depots the IC built before the Great Depression. The building was listed on the National Register of Historic Places in 1990.

References

Railway stations in the United States opened in 1927
Tudor Revival architecture in Iowa
Prairie School architecture in Iowa
Former railway stations in Iowa
Former Illinois Central Railroad stations
Railway stations on the National Register of Historic Places in Iowa
National Register of Historic Places in Hardin County, Iowa
Transportation buildings and structures in Hardin County, Iowa